Qaleh Chek (also Romanized as Qal‘eh Chek; also known as Qal‘eh Kūchek) is a village in Howmeh Rural District, in the Central District of Garmsar County, Semnan Province, Iran. At the 2006 census, its population was 60, in 18 families.

References 

Populated places in Garmsar County